Finnish Steam Locomotive Class F1 was a class of tank locomotives, which did not have to be turned at terminal stations. The water tank was located below the space behind the cab, in contrast to more modern tank locomotives where the water tanks usually placed either side of or on top of the boiler.

F1 locomotives were used in Helsinki, Tampere, Turku and Viipuri for local traffic, which they could easily handle. When the local transport in the early 1900s increased, the F1 locomotives proved no longer sufficiently powerful, and they were replaced by more powerful Vk1/I1 locomotives. They were employed moving lightweight mixed trains short distances, a task for which they were well suited. The F1s were withdrawn in the 1930s. The only surviving F1 is the number 132 at the Finnish Railway Museum, which is painted in the livery that was applied as new.

See also
 Finnish Railway Museum
 VR Group
 List of Finnish locomotives
 List of railway museums Worldwide
 Heritage railways
 List of heritage railways
 Restored trains
 Jokioinen Museum Railway
 History of rail transport in Finland

External links
Finnish Railway Museum
Steam Locomotives in Finland Including the Finnish Railway Museum

Gallery

References

VR locomotives
F1
Railway locomotives introduced in 1885
SLM locomotives
0-4-4 locomotives
5 ft gauge locomotives